"Teen Age Idol" is a song written by Jack Lewis and performed by Rick Nelson. The song reached #2 on the adult contemporary chart, #5 on the Billboard Hot 100, and #39 in the UK in 1962.  The single's B-side, "I've Got My Eyes on You (And I Like What I See)", reached #105 on the Billboard chart.

The song is ranked #77 on Billboard magazine's Top 100 songs of 1962.

Cover versions
Jo Ann Campbell released a version as a single in New Zealand in 1962.
Keith Moon released a version on his 1975 album, Two Sides of the Moon.
 Under the title L'idole des jeunes (1963), Teen age idol is one of French singer Johnny Hallyday's most famous singles.
The Vandals covered the song on their 1991 album Fear of a Punk Planet.

References

Songs about teenagers
1962 songs
1962 singles
Ricky Nelson songs
Imperial Records singles